Pierre Graber (6 December 1908 – 19 July 2003) was a Swiss politician and member of the Swiss Federal Council (1970–1978).

He was born in La Chaux-de-Fonds, Switzerland and after studying law in Neuchâtel and Vienna he became attorney-at-law in Lausanne. Active in the Social Democratic Party, he was in the municipal parliament of Lausanne (1934–1946), member of the parliament of the canton of Vaud (1937–1946), mayor of Lausanne (1946–1949), member of the National Council (1942–1969, except 1963), he was the Speaker of that Assembly from 1965/66, he sat in the Foreign affairs committee and was deputy chairman of the enquiry parliamentary committee dealing with the Mirage affair. He was also a member of the government of the canton of Vaud (1962–1970) in charge of the Finance Department. He served as one of the four members of the Commission to resolve the problem of the Jura.

He was elected to the Swiss Federal Council on 10 December 1969. During his time in office, he headed the Political Department, i.e. ministry of foreign affairs. Graber was President of the Confederation in 1975 and handed over office on 31 January 1978. During his term of office, a new law for Cooperation Development was adopted. On 1 August 1975, he signed the Helsinki Final Act of the CSCE on behalf of Switzerland. He obtained the ratification by Parliament of the European Convention on Human Rights in 1974. As president of the Committee of Ministers of the Council of Europe, he laid the first stone of the Palace of Europe in Strasbourg on 15 May 1972. At his initiative, Switzerland recognized North Vietnam and North Korea. Graber presided over the diplomatic conference that led to the adoption of the additional protocols to the Geneva Conventions in 1977. He faced the first terrorist attack on a Swissair plane in Zarqa, Jordan in 1970. After retiring, he gave his opinion on major occasions including Switzerland's unsuccessful attempt to join the United Nations in 1986.

Bibliography
Pierre Graber: Mémoires et réflexions; Lausanne: Editions 24 heures, 1992;  — autobiography.

External links

1908 births
2003 deaths
Members of the Federal Council (Switzerland)
Presidents of the National Council (Switzerland)
Mayors of Lausanne
Social Democratic Party of Switzerland politicians
People from La Chaux-de-Fonds
Members of the National Council (Switzerland)
Foreign ministers of Switzerland
People from Lausanne